The Waltmire Bridge is a historic bridge which carried Locust Road across the Mackinaw River  south of Tremont, Illinois. The bridge was built in 1910 by contractor Edward Cooney at the site of Waltmire's Ford, a shallow point in the river that could only be easily crossed when water levels were low. Both the ford and the bridge were named for local farmer John Waltmire. The bridge has a steel Pratt through truss design, which consists of vertical compression supports and diagonal tension supports. The bridge, which is now closed to traffic, is one of two surviving metal truss bridges across the Mackinaw River.

The bridge was added to the National Register of Historic Places on February 5, 1999.

References

Road bridges on the National Register of Historic Places in Illinois
Bridges completed in 1910
National Register of Historic Places in Tazewell County, Illinois
Steel bridges in the United States
Pratt truss bridges in the United States
Bridges in Tazewell County, Illinois